Sorites is a genus of benthic Foraminifera, in the family Soritidae,  order Miliolida. Its Type species is Nautilus orbiculus (Forsskål in Niebuhr, 1775). Its chronostratigraphic range ranges from the Miocene to the present.

Classification 
Sorites includes the following species:

 Sorites dominicensis (uncertain)
 Sorites duplex
 Sorites edentulus (uncertain)
 Sorites grecoensis (fossil only)
 Sorites marginalis
 Sorites orbiculus
 Sorites pseudodiscoidea
 Sorites variabilis

Other species include:

 Sorites discoideus, accepted as Cycloputeolina discoidea
 Sorites hofkeri, accepted as Parasorites orbitolitoides
 Sorites orbitolitoides, accepted as Parasorites orbitolitoides

Bibliography 

Tubothalamea